Josip Škrabl (28 January 1903 – 6 June 1973) was a Yugoslav cyclist. He competed in the individual and team road race events at the 1928 Summer Olympics.

References

External links
 

1903 births
1973 deaths
Yugoslav male cyclists
Olympic cyclists of Yugoslavia
Cyclists at the 1928 Summer Olympics
Place of birth missing